Jacques Bousquet (1883–1939) was a French actor and screenwriter.

Selected filmography
 Dancing Mad (1925)
 A Gentleman of the Ring (1926)
 Rendezvous (1930)
 Love Songs (1930)
 My Wife's Teacher (1930)
 A Gentleman of the Ring (1932)
 The Regiment's Champion (1932)
 To the Polls, Citizens (1932)
 A Happy Man (1932)
 Court Waltzes (1933)
 Idylle au Caire (1933)
 Night in May (1934)
 Stradivarius (1935)
 Under Western Eyes (1936)
 The Brighton Twins (1936)

References

Bibliography
 Waldman, Harry. Missing Reels: Lost Films of American and European Cinema. McFarland, 2000.

External links

1883 births
1939 deaths
French male film actors
20th-century French screenwriters
Male actors from Paris